The 2021 Judo Grand Slam Paris was to be held at the Accor Arena in Paris, France, from 8–9 May 2021, but postponed to 16–17 October 2021.

Event videos
The event was aired freely on the IJF YouTube channel.

Medal summary

Men's events

Women's events

Source Results

Medal table

Prize money
The sums written are per medalist, bringing the total prizes awarded to 154,000€.

References

External links
 

2021 IJF World Tour
2021 Judo Grand Slam
Judo
Judo
Grand Slam Paris 2021
Judo
Judo